Jon Arvid Lea (born 9 September 1948) is a Norwegian civil servant.

He is a cand.polit. by education. He was a head of department in the Norwegian Ministry of Government Administration from 1994. In 1997 he was acting County Governor of Hedmark, and from 1999 to 2001 he was acting County Governor of Buskerud. After a year as director of secondary schools in Vestfold County Municipality, from 2002 to 2003, he was hired as the first director of the Norwegian Directorate for Civil Protection and Emergency Planning.

References

1948 births
Living people
Norwegian civil servants
Directors of government agencies of Norway
County governors of Norway